Pi Recordings is a jazz record label founded by Seth Rosner in 2001. He was soon joined as partner by Yulun Wang. Pi specializes in avant-garde jazz. Its first two albums were by Henry Threadgill.

Pi's roster includes Amir ElSaffar, Anthony Braxton, Corey Wilkes, James Blood Ulmer, Leroy Jenkins, Liberty Ellman, Marc Ribot, Muhal Richard Abrams, Roscoe Mitchell, Rudresh Mahanthappa, Steve Lehman, Art Ensemble of Chicago, Steve Coleman, Vijay Iyer, and Wadada Leo Smith.

In its first twenty years, Pi released fewer than a hundred recordings. In 2021, DownBeat wrote that "Pi releases rigorous, pathbreaking music that stretches the boundaries of jazz while honoring its history."

Discography

Main series
 Everybodys Mouth's a Book (2001) – Henry Threadgill
 Up Popped the Two Lips (2001) – Henry Threadgill
 Song for My Sister (2002) – Roscoe Mitchell & The Note Factory
 The Year of the Elephant (2002) – Wadada Leo Smith's Golden Quartet
 Your Life Flashes (2002) – Fieldwork (Vijay Iyer, Elliot Humberto Kavee, Aaron Stewart)
 Organic Resonance (2003) – Wadada Leo Smith& Anthony Braxton
 The Meeting (2003) – Art Ensemble of Chicago
 Tactiles (2003) – Liberty Ellman
 In What Language? (2003) – Vijay Iyer & Mike Ladd
 Saturn, Conjunct the Grand Canyon in a Sweet Embrace (2004) – Wadada Leo Smith & Anthony Braxton
 Sirius Calling (2004) – Art Ensemble of Chicago
 Juncture (2004) – Various Artists
 And Now... (2004) – Revolutionary Ensemble
 Mother Tongue (2004) – Rudresh Mahanthappa
 Spiritual Unity (2005) – Marc Ribot
 Simulated Progress (2005) – Fieldwork (Vijay Iyer, Steve Lehman, Elliot Humberto Kavee)
 Demian as Posthuman (2005) – Steve Lehman
 Back in Time (2005) – James Blood Ulmer
 Ophiuchus Butterfly (2006) – Liberty Ellman
 Non-Cognitive Aspects of the City (2006) – Art Ensemble of Chicago
 Codebook (2006) – Rudresh Mahanthappa
 Streaming (2006) – Muhal Richard Abrams, George E. Lewis & Roscoe Mitchell
 Vision Towards Essence (2007) – Muhal Richard Abrams
 Two Rivers (2007) – Amir ElSaffar
 On Meaning (2007) – Steve Lehman
 Door (2008) – Fieldwork (Vijay Iyer, Steve Lehman, Tyshawn Sorey)
 Party Intellectuals (2008) –  Marc Ribot's Ceramic Dog
 Kinsmen (2008) – Rudresh Mahanthappa
 Cries from tha Ghetto (2009) – Corey Wilkes
 Travail Transformation and Flow (2009) – Steve Lehman
 This Brings Us to Volume 1 (2009) – Henry Threadgill Zooid
 Radif Suite (2010) – Amir ElSaffar & Hafez Modirzadeh
 Harvesting Semblances and Affinities (2010) –  Steve Coleman and Five Elements
 Silent Movies (2010) – Marc Ribot
 Apex (2010) – Rudresh Mahanthappa & Bunky Green
 This Brings Us to Volume 2 (2010) – Henry Threadgill Zooid
 SoundDance (2011) – Muhal Richard Abrams with Fred Anderson and George E. Lewis
 The Mancy of Sound (2011) – Steve Coleman and Five Elements
 Synastry (2011) – Jen Shyu & Mark Dresser
 Oblique–1 (2011) – Tyshawn Sorey
 Inana (2011) – Amir ElSaffar
 Dialect Fluorescent (2012) – Steve Lehman Trio
 Tomorrow Sunny / The Revelry, Spp (2012) – Henry Threadgill Zooid
 Post–Chromodal Out! (2012) – Hafez Modirzadeh
 Reunion: Live in New York (2012) – Sam Rivers Trio
 Continuum (2012) – David Virelles
 Functional Arrhythmias (2013) –  Steve Coleman and Five Elements
 Moment and the Message (2013) – Jonathan Finlayson & Sicilian Defence
 Holding It Down: The Veterans' Dreams Project (2013) – Vijay Iyer & Mike Ladd
 Fiction (2013) – Matt Mitchell
 Alchemy (2013) – Amir ElSaffar
 Fourteen (2014) – Dan Weiss
 Live at the Village Vanguard (2014) – Marc Ribot Trio
 Mise en Abîme (2014) –Steve Lehman Octet
 In Convergence Liberation (2014) – Hafez Modirzadeh, ETHEL
 Alloy (2014) – Tyshawn Sorey
 Synovial Joints (2015) – Steve Coleman and the Council of Balance
 In for a Penny, In for a Pound (2015) – Henry Threadgill's Zooid
 Crisis (2015) – Amir ElSaffar Two Rivers Ensemble
 Radiate (2015) – Liberty Ellman
 Sounds and Cries of the World (2015) – Jen Shyu & Jade Tongue
 Vista Accumulation (2015) – Matt Mitchell
 Sixteen: Drummers Suite (2016) – Dan Weiss
 Old Locks and Irregular Verbs (2016) – Henry Threadgill
 The Inner Spectrum of Variables (2016) – Tyshawn Sorey
 Sélébéyone (2016) – Steve Lehman
 Moving Still (2016) – Jonathan Finlayson
 Trickster (2017) – Miles Okazaki
 Morphogenesis (2017) – Steve Coleman's Natal Eclipse
 Verisimilitude (2017) – Tyshawn Sorey
 A Pouting Grimace (2017) – Matt Mitchell
 Song of Silver Geese (2017) – Jen Shyu
 Dirt… And More Dirt (2018) – Henry Threadgill 14 or 15 Kestra: Agg
 Starebaby (2018) – Dan Weiss
 Double Up, Plays Double Up Plus (2018) – Henry Threadgill
 Live at the Village Vanguard, Vol. 1 (The Embedded Sets) (2018) – Steve Coleman and Five Elements
 3 Times Round (2018) – Jonathan Finlayson
 Igbó Alákọrin (The Singer’s Grove) Vol. I & II (2018) – David Virelles
 Clockwise (2019) – Anna Webber
 We Are On The Edge: A 50th Anniversary Celebration (2019) – Art Ensemble of Chicago
 Phalanx Ambassadors (2019) – Matt Mitchell
 The People I Love (2019) – Steve Lehman
 The Adornment of Time (2019) – Tyshawn Sorey & Marilyn Crispell
 The Sky Below (2019) – Miles Okazaki
 Last Desert (2020) – Liberty Ellman
 Natural Selection (2020) – Dan Weiss

Reissues
901 Blood Sutra (2006) – Vijay Iyer – originally released on Artists House in 2003
902 Reimagining (2006) – Vijay Iyer – originally released on Savoy Jazz in 2005
903 Raw Materials (2006) – Vijay Iyer & Rudresh Mahanthappa – originally released on Savoy Jazz in 2006
904 Panoptic Modes (2010) – Vijay Iyer – originally released on Red Giant in 2001

See also 
 List of record labels

References

External links
 Official site
 Interview with owner Seth Rosner
 New York Times Article
 Business Week Interview with Yulun Wang

American record labels
Record labels established in 2001
Jazz record labels